Pierre Barlaguet (18 October 1931 – 16 October 2018) was a French football manager and player, known for his association with Nîmes. He also managed Mazamet, Châtellerault, Vichy and Bourges.

Honours
Orders
Chevalier of the Légion d'honneur: 1997

References

1931 births
2018 deaths
French footballers
Nîmes Olympique players
Association football midfielders
French football managers
Bourges 18 managers
Nîmes Olympique managers
Chevaliers of the Légion d'honneur
Sportspeople from Gard
INF Vichy managers
Footballers from Occitania (administrative region)